"I Only Wanted You" is a song written by Tom Shapiro, Michael Garvin and Bucky Jones, and recorded by American country music artist Marie Osmond.  It was released in December 1986 as the second single and title track from the album I Only Wanted You.  The song reached number 13 on the Billboard Hot Country Singles & Tracks chart.

Chart performance

References

1987 singles
1986 songs
Marie Osmond songs
Songs written by Tom Shapiro
Song recordings produced by Paul Worley
Capitol Records Nashville singles
Curb Records singles
Songs written by Michael Garvin
Songs written by Bucky Jones